Maroochydore is a coastal suburb of the Sunshine Coast, Queensland, Australia, and is the central suburb and central business district of the Maroochydore urban centre.

Maroochydore contains a popular surf beach. The Maroochy River's southern bank forms a virtually unbroken stretch of parkland and picnic spots in the area known as Cotton Tree. An oceanway encourages sustainable travel by pedestrians and cyclists along the beaches.

Maroochydore is also a major commercial area of the Sunshine Coast with most shopping precincts located in the central business district. It is home to the Sunshine Plaza shopping centre and the Sunshine Coast's major bus interchange for Translink services on Sunshine Coast.

History 
Maroochydore Post Office opened on 4 October 1922 (a receiving office had been open from 1891 until 1898, and from 1916).

Maroochydore Provisional School opened on 25 August 1921. On 1 September 1924, it became Maroochydore State School.

Our Lady Star of the Sea (Stella Maris) Catholic Church was officially opened by Archbishop James Duhig on Sunday 15 October 1950. It replaced an earlier church which had become inadequate for the growing congregation. The 1950 church could seat 170 people in the nave and a further 150 people on the verandahs on either side of the church. Timber from the recently demolished St Joseph's Catholic Church in Nambour was used to construct the Maroochydore church to reduce the costs. The architect was Frank Cullen and the contractor was K. D. Morris.

Maroochydore State High School opened on 28 January 1964.

The Maroochydore Library opened in 1975.

Stella Maris School opened on 30 January 1980.

Horton Park Golf Club was in Maroochydore. The club relocated to Bli Bli in May 2015 and changed names to Maroochy River Golf Club. The relocation of the golf course allowed the Sunshine Regional Council to develop the old golf course into a new city centre for the region known as Sunshine Central. The redevelopment is next to Sunshine Cove, a new sustainable residential and commercial development that has revitalized the general town centre and the development won the award from the Urban Development Institute of Australia for the best residential property Development at its annual Australian awards night in 2016.

Education 

Maroochydore State School is a government primary (Early Childhood-6) school for boys and girls at 56–68 Primary School Court. In 2018, the school had an enrolment of 256 students with 28 teachers (21 full-time equivalent) and 25 non-teaching staff (18 full-time equivalent). It includes a special education program.

Stella Maris School is a Catholic primary (Prep-6) school for boys and girls at McKenzie Drive. In 2018, the school had an enrolment of 833 students with 47 teachers (43 full-time equivalent) and 34 non-teaching staff (22 full-time equivalent).

Maroochydore State High School is a government secondary (7–12) school for boys and girls at 160 Maroochydore Road. In 2018, the school had an enrolment of 1321 students with 106 teachers (97 full-time equivalent) and 47 non-teaching staff (34 full-time equivalent). It includes a special education program.

References

Suburbs of the Sunshine Coast Region
Maroochydore
Coastline of Queensland